Botany Hill, formerly known as Botany Quarry, is a Site of Special Scientific Interest in the Teesdale district of south-west County Durham, England. It occupies a position on both sides of How Gill, just under 1 km north of the village of Hury, in Baldersdale.

The site is important as the type locality of the Botany Limestone, a widespread marker horizon that is key to an understanding of the stratigraphy of the Namurian sediments of the North Pennines and Northumberland Trough.

References

Sites of Special Scientific Interest in County Durham